Robin Sid (born 21 September 1994) is a Finnish football player who plays for Finnish Veikkausliiga side Mariehamn.

Career

Club career
On 19 November 2019, Sid signed a deal until the end of 2021 with SJK, starting from the 2020 season.

On 27 January 2022, he returned to Mariehamn for the 2022 season.

Career statistics

References

External links
 
 

1994 births
Living people
Finnish footballers
Finland youth international footballers
Veikkausliiga players
Kakkonen players
IFK Mariehamn players
Ekenäs IF players
Seinäjoen Jalkapallokerho players
Association football midfielders